Sandra Cattaneo (born 25 January 1975) is a Swiss ice hockey player. She competed in the women's tournament at the 2006 Winter Olympics.

References

1975 births
Living people
Swiss women's ice hockey forwards
Ice hockey people from Zürich
Olympic ice hockey players of Switzerland
Ice hockey players at the 2006 Winter Olympics